Trackle was an online service that enabled users to track what they cared about on the web in one central place. Trackle offered a variety of information categories that users could keep tabs on and share like-interests with groups of users via Twitter, SMS and Email.

As of 2013, the domain name redirects to a different company founded by the same person.

What it did 

Trackle notified its users whenever there was some new information on topics of their interest. Following are some of the categories users could register to get notifications (aka "alerts"):

Local information specific to a user's neighborhood or city
Any new crime reported in a user's neighborhood recently
Local events and news
Recent home price fluctuations
Social events relating to a user's friends and groups
New job leads with matching criteria
Birthdays and special occasions
Shopping
New classifieds listings on Craigslist
Price drops on desired products
Product availability
Sports
Major league sports scores (NFL, NBA, NHL, MLB)
NCAA football and basketball
Ski conditions

How it worked 

Trackle defined search agents called "Tracklets" to store settings for a particular type of search. Users could set up Tracklets for categories of interest and personalize the Tracklets by entering appropriate information, for example, zip code for weather alert, actor name for upcoming movie releases, and product details for tracking price drops. Trackle alert platform was linked to RSS feeds from various content providers. Trackle ran the personalized searches periodically in the background and got the requested content.  It generated alerts whenever it found a new match and provided automatic notifications over the web, email or SMS based on the Tracklet configuration. Trackle offered a "preview" feature to enable users to refine their custom parameters before setting up a Tracklet for a new category. Users could lookup Tracklets being used by any of their friends as long as they had marked them marked as 'public'.

Company 

Trackle was founded by Pavan Nigam, a Silicon Valley based entrepreneur, who co-founded Healtheon, and was founder/CEO of Cendura, later acquired by Computer Associates; and Naveen Saxena, a seasoned technology executive who has held senior positions at Cisco, Healtheon and Fidelity. Trackle was funded by NEA (New Enterprise Associates) and angel investors. Trackle was a privately held company based in Sunnyvale, CA.

References

External links 

 Former location of Trackle's website

American websites